What Makes a Family is a 2001 American television film directed by Maggie Greenwald and starring Brooke Shields, Cherry Jones, Anne Meara, Al Waxman, and Whoopi Goldberg. It was distributed by Lifetime Television. The film premiered on the network on January 22, 2001.

Plot
Based on a true story, the film involves a lesbian couple living in Florida who choose to have a child. Janine Nielsen (Brooke Shields) and her partner, Sandy Cataldi (Cherry Jones), elect to conceive a baby via artificial insemination with Sandy as the biological mother. After the birth of their daughter Heather, Sandy is diagnosed with systemic lupus when she collapses at the baby's christening. The couple handles the disease for several years until Sandy dies. Following her death, Sandy's parents (Anne Meara and Al Waxman) sue to gain custody of the child. Addressing moral, legal and ethical issues, Janine's lawyer (Whoopi Goldberg) wins the custody battle after a video tape surfaces in which Sandy expressed her love for both Janine and Heather and her wish for them to stay together.

Cast
Brooke Shields as Janine Nielssen
Cherry Jones as Sandy Cataldi
Anne Meara as Evelyn Cataldi
Al Waxman as Frank Cataldi
Whoopi Goldberg as Terry Harrison

Production
The film was directed by Maggie Greenwald, with the screenplay written by Robert L. Freedman. The executive producers were Barbra Streisand, Whoopi Goldberg, Cis Corman, Craig Zadan and Neil Meron.

Reception
Ron Wertheimer of The New York Times praised several aspects of movie and stated: "Dripping with good intentions but enriched by performances of genuine depth, What Makes a Family, tonight on Lifetime, rises several notches above the usual based-on-a-true-story television movie." Andy Webb of The Movie Scene gave "What Makes a Family" three out of five stars, concluding: "What this all boils down to is that "What Makes a Family" was not the movie I expected and in some ways a far better one. Instead of being the legal drama about rights what you get is this pleasant drama about being a family and it works."

What Makes a Family won one GLAAD Media Award in the category of "Outstanding Television Movie". The film was also nominated for one Humanitas Prize in the category of "90 Minute or Longer Cable Category".

References

External links
 What Makes a Family at Lifetime 
 

2001 television films
2001 films
2001 drama films
2001 LGBT-related films
American LGBT-related films
LGBT-related drama films
LGBT-related films based on actual events
Lesbian-related films
Lesbian-related television shows
Films set in Florida
Barwood Films films
Films directed by Maggie Greenwald
American drama television films
2000s English-language films
2000s American films